Canadian Comedy Shorts is a television show airing on The Comedy Network, which showcases the short films and videos of Canadian filmmakers.

External links
Canadian Comedy Shorts at The Comedy Network

Year of Canadian television series debut missing
Year of Canadian television series ending missing
CTV Comedy Channel original programming